Reeder is a  defunct station on the Reading Company's New Hope Branch. The station is currently on the line used by the New Hope and Ivyland Railroad. This station was a flag stop located on Reeder Road at milepost 35, and was named after Pennsylvania's first food and dairy commissioner, Eastburn Reeder, a native of Solebury Township.

References

Former Reading Company stations
Former railway stations in Bucks County, Pennsylvania
Railway stations in the United States opened in 1891
Railway stations closed in 1952
1891 establishments in Pennsylvania